Lintern is a surname. Notable people with the surname include:

 Mel Lintern (born 1950), English footballer
 Richard Lintern (born 1962), English actor